Vincent Seitlinger (born 18 January 1987) is a French politician. He has represented Moselle's 5th constituency in the National Assembly since 2022.

His father Jean Seitlinger was MP for the same constituency from 1973 to 1997

References 

1980 births
Living people
21st-century French politicians
Deputies of the 16th National Assembly of the French Fifth Republic
Members of Parliament for Moselle
The Republicans (France) politicians
Sciences Po alumni